In mathematics, a super vector space is a -graded vector space, that is, a vector space over a field  with a given decomposition of subspaces of grade  and grade . The study of super vector spaces and their generalizations is sometimes called super linear algebra. These objects find their principal application in theoretical physics where they are used to describe the various algebraic aspects of supersymmetry.

Definitions 

A super vector space is a -graded vector space with decomposition

Vectors of parity  are called even and those of parity  are called odd. In theoretical physics, the even elements are sometimes called Bose elements or bosonic, and the odd elements Fermi elements or fermionic. Definitions for super vector spaces are often given only in terms of homogeneous elements and then extended to nonhomogeneous elements by linearity.

The standard super coordinate space, denoted , is the ordinary coordinate space  where the even subspace is spanned by the first  coordinate basis vectors and the odd space is spanned by the last .

A homogeneous subspace of a super vector space is a linear subspace that is spanned by homogeneous elements. Homogeneous subspaces are super vector spaces in their own right (with the obvious grading).

For any super vector space , one can define the parity reversed space  to be the super vector space with the even and odd subspaces interchanged. That is,

Linear transformations

A homomorphism, a morphism in the category of super vector spaces, from one super vector space to another is a grade-preserving linear transformation. A linear transformation  between super vector spaces is grade preserving if

An isomorphism of super vector spaces is a bijective homomorphism. The set of all homomorphisms  is denoted .

Every linear transformation, not necessarily grade-preserving, from one super vector space to another can be written uniquely as the sum of a grade-preserving transformation and a grade-reversing one—that is, a transformation  such that 

In particular,

Operations on super vector spaces 

The usual algebraic constructions for ordinary vector spaces have their counterpart in the super vector space setting.

Dual space 

Direct sum 

Direct sums of super vector spaces are constructed as in the ungraded case with the grading given by

Tensor product 

One can also construct tensor products of super vector spaces. Here the additive structure of  comes into play. The underlying space is as in the ungraded case with the grading given by

Specifically, one has

Supermodules

Just as one may generalize vector spaces over a field to modules over a commutative ring, one may generalize super vector spaces over a field to supermodules over a supercommutative algebra (or ring).

A common construction when working with super vector spaces is to enlarge the field of scalars to a supercommutative Grassmann algebra. Given a field  let

denote the Grassmann algebra generated by  anticommuting odd elements .

The category of super vector spaces

The categorical approach to super linear algebra is to first formulate definitions and theorems regarding ordinary (ungraded) algebraic objects in the language of category theory and then transfer these directly to the category of super vector spaces. This leads to a treatment of "superobjects" such as superalgebras, Lie superalgebras, supergroups, etc. that is completely analogous to their ungraded counterparts.

The category  is a monoidal category with the super tensor product as the monoidal product and the purely even super vector space  as the unit object. The involutive braiding operator

given by

on homogeneous elements, turns  into a symmetric monoidal category. This commutativity isomorphism encodes the "rule of signs" that is essential to super linear algebra. It effectively says that a minus sign is picked up whenever two odd elements are interchanged. One need not worry about signs in the categorical setting as long as the above operator is used wherever appropriate.

The ordinary  set  is the even subspace therein:

The fact that  is closed means that the functor  is left adjoint to the functor , given a natural bijection

Superalgebra 

A superalgebra over  can be described as a super vector space  with a multiplication map

that is a super vector space homomorphism. This is equivalent to demanding

Notes

References 

Categories in category theory